Novy Bor is a settlement in the Komi Republic, Russia, located near the border of the republic on the shores of the Pechora River.

References 

Rural localities in the Komi Republic